The Calmeyer Street Mission House was a building  located at Calmeyers gate  no. 1 in Oslo, Norway. The building served as a religious assembly house  for Lutheran gatherings in the Oslo neighborhood around Hausmanns gate (Hausmann Street).

History
Calmeyer Street Mission House  was a Gothic Revival structure designed by the architect Henrik Nissen. Educator and businessman Otto Treider was largely responsible for the mission house being built in 1891.  At the time, it contained Scandinavia's largest assembly hall, capable of accommodating over 5,000 people.

Kristiania Home Mission Society took over the building in 1898. This provided a venue for a series of large gatherings, including full-scale revivals in 1905 and 1906 that filled the building night after night. Prime Minister Christian Michelsen also delivered a speech there in 1905. The building was also the location of the Calmeyer Street Meeting (Calmeyergatemøtet) from February 15th to 18th,  1920 during debates between liberal and orthodox theologians within the Church of Norway.

During the German occupation (1940–45), the building was requisitioned by the German military. Until the 1950s, the building was frequently used for concerts and as a warehouse until it was razed in 1972.
The lot was used as a parking lot, among other purposes, until the Church City Mission (Kirkens Bymisjon) built an office building with rental housing there. After the new building was completed in 1987, the office space was leased to Norwegian Board of Health Supervision (Statens helsetilsyn).

See also
Jens Frølich Tandberg
Ole Hallesby

References

Related reading
Bernt T. Oftestad; Tarald Rasmussen; Jan Scumacher (2001) Norsk kirkehistorie (Universitetsforlaget, Oslo)  

Culture in Oslo
History of Oslo
Buildings and structures in Oslo
Religious buildings and structures completed in 1891